The 2016 Trophée des Champions was the 21st edition of the French super cup. The match was contested by the 2015–16 Ligue 1 and Coupe de France champions Paris Saint-Germain, and the runners-up of Ligue 1, Lyon. The match was played at the Wörthersee Stadion in Klagenfurt, Austria.

PSG were the three-time defending champions, having defeated Lyon in the 2015 edition, which was played in Canada.

PSG won the match, beating Lyon 4–1.

Match

Details

See also 
 2015–16 Ligue 1
 2015–16 Coupe de France

References

External links 
  

2016–17 in French football
2016–17 in Austrian football
2016
International club association football competitions hosted by Austria
Paris Saint-Germain F.C. matches
Olympique Lyonnais matches
Sports competitions in Klagenfurt
August 2016 sports events in Europe